The lex Junia Licinia or lex Junia et Licinia was an ancient Roman law produced in 62 BC that confirmed the similar lex Caecilia Didia of 98 BC. 

The lex Junia Licinia was a consular law of Decimus Junius Silanus and Lucius Licinius Murena enacted during their consulship. This new law additionally served to protect the people's assembly from being tricked into passing laws containing hidden unrelated items that may have been misconstrued or unethical. These dubious proposals otherwise would not pass on their own merit, and so were a rider. This additional law by Murena put more enforcement to the original Didian law with greater punishment for not complying. 

It also enacted ne clam aerario legem inferri liceret, meaning that a copy of any proposed statute must be deposited before witnesses at the aerarium before it was brought to the comitia for final approval and made law. The reasoning behind this was to prevent forgery. It was to have a public open notification period of 3 nundinae (17 days market days or three Roman eight-day weeks or 24 days). This was to put any new proposed law into formal public announcement before passing.

See also
Christmas tree bill
List of Roman laws
Omnibus bill
Roman Law

Notes

References 
Adam, Alexander, Roman antiquities: or, An account of the manners and customs of the Romans, 1835 edition 12
Cicero, Marcus Tullius, The correspondence of M. Tullius Cicero, Volume 1, Edition 2 1885 (Google Books)

Roman law
62 BC
1st century BC in law
1st century BC in the Roman Republic